Hormaphidinae is a subfamily of the family Aphididae.

Genera

Tribe: Cerataphidini
Aleurodaphis -
Astegopteryx -
Cerataphis -
Ceratoglyphina -
Ceratovacuna -
Chaitoregma -
Glyphinaphis -
Ktenopteryx -
Pseudoregma -
Tuberaphis

Tribe: Hormaphidini
Doraphis -
Hamamelistes -
Hormaphis -
Protohormaphis -
Tsugaphis

Tribe: Nipponaphidini
Allothoracaphis -
Asiphonipponaphis -
Dermaphis -
Dinipponaphis -
Distylaphis -
Euthoracaphis -
Indonipponaphis -
Lithoaphis -
Mesothoracaphis -
Metanipponaphis -
Metathoracaphis -
Microunguis -
Monzenia -
Neodermaphis -
Neohormaphis -
Neonipponaphis -
Neoreticulaphis -
Neothoracaphis -
Nipponaphis -
Paranipponaphis -
Parathoracaphis -
Parathoracaphisella -
Pseudothoracaphis -
Quadrartus -
Quernaphis - 
Reticulaphis - 
Schizoneuraphis -
Sinonipponaphis -
Thoracaphis

References

 
Hemiptera subfamilies